CECRI may refer to 
Centre d'Etudes des Crises et Conflits Internationaux, a research center at the University of Louvain (UCLouvain) 
Central Electro Chemical Research Institute, a CSIR laboratory in Tamil Nadu, India